Bergneustadt is a municipality in the eastern part of the Oberbergischer Kreis (district), in North Rhine-Westphalia, Germany. It is located 50 km east of Cologne. It is part of the Berg region.

History
In 1301 the drost Rutger of Altena started with the construction of the Niestat, as an outpost of the County of Mark against the archbishop of Cologne, on the request of Eberhard II, Count of the Mark. The new "Veste" soon received the same rights as Lüdenscheid. Together with Wipperfürth, Lüdenscheid and Lennep, it belongs to a series of town foundations of the 13th century in the border region of the County of Mark and the County of Berg.

The new town had impressive fortifications, including the town castle on a mountain spur above the river Dörspe. Parts of the town walls have survived. After early 17th century Neustadt went into decline, due to war, epidemics, fires and decreased strategic importance. After 1830 the construction of major roads and the railway lines from Siegburg and Cologne to Olpe (1896-1903) helped the town to new growth, further aided by strong industrial growth since the 1950s. The main activities are car industry, paper treatment, metal treatment and plastic treatment as well as mechanical engineering.

Older than the main town are Wiedenest (1154), Altenothe (1237), Belmicke (1296); they all are a part of Bergneustadt since 1969. The decorated church (Bunte Kirche) in Wiedenest dates from the 12th century and is one of the most beautiful churches in North Rhine-Westphalia.

Geography

Bergneustadt is situated in the Bergisches Land, an area of low hills east of the river Rhine and west of the higher Sauerland hills. The town lies in the valley of the small river Dörspe, a tributary of the Agger. Neighbouring municipalities are Gummersbach to the west, Drolshagen to the east, and Reichshof to the south.

The municipality Bergneustadt consists of the main town Bergneustadt and 22 Ortsteile (districts): Altenothe, Attenbach, Auf dem Dümpel, Baldenberg, Belmicke, Bösinghausen, Brelöh, Freischlade, Geschleide, Hackenberg, Höh, Hüngringhausen, Immicke, Leienbach, Neuenothe, Niederrengse, Pernze, Pustenbach, Rosenthal, Rosenthalseifen, Wiedenest and Wörde. The largest of these are Hackenberg (pop. 3,326 in 2005), Wiedenest (pop. 3,029) and Pernze (pop. 1,071).

Politics
Bergneustadt has a youth council which allows the council to participate in decision-making for the city.

The coat of arms
The arms were granted on December 24, 1876.

The town developed around a castle built in 1301 by Rüttger von Altena ordered by Earl Eberhard II of the Mark. The oldest seals of the city date from the middle of the 14th century and already show the present arms. The upper part of the arms shows the arms of the Counts of the Mark, the lower part the older arms of the (oldest) Counts of Berg, from which the Counts of the Mark descended. From 1922-1969 the city used a mural crown on the arms.

Buildings and institutions

Historical buildings
 In the district Wiedenest stands a "colored church" with colorful medieval paintings at the ceiling.

Public utilities

Libraries
 Public library Bergneustadt

Banks
 Sparkasse (Savings bank) Gummersbach-Bergneustadt with four offices (city centre, district Stadtwald, district Wiedenest, district Pernze)
 Commerzbank with one office
 Deutsche Bank with one office
 Volksbank Oberberg e.V. with one office

Schools
"Gemeinschaftsgrundschule Bergneustadt 'Auf dem Bursten' " (primary school)
"Katholische Grundschule Bergneustadt" (catholic primary school)
"Gemeinschaftsgrundschule Bergneustadt-Hackenberg" (primary school)
"Gemeinschaftsgrundschule Bergneustadt-Wiedenest" (primary school)
"Wüllenweber Gymnasium" (grammar school/high school Bergneustadt)
"Städtische Realschule Bergneustadt" (city secondary school)
"Gemeinschaftshauptschule" (general school Bergneustadt)

Religious groups and communities

Protestant parishes and churches 
 Evangelische Kirchengemeinde Bergneustadt (Lutheran denomination) with • Altstadtkirche (17th century)• Versöhnerkirche, district Stadtwald (1966)• Gemeindecentrum Hackenberg (1976)
 Evangelische Kirchengemeinde Wiedenest (Lutheran denomination) with churches in• Wiedenest (Bunte Kerk, 11th century)• Neuenothe (chapel, 1960s)• Pernze (1960s)

Roman Catholic parishes and churches
 Roman Catholic parish Saint Stephanus, Bergneustadt
 Roman Catholic parish Saint Matthias, Hackenberg
 Roman Catholic parish Saint Anna, Belmicke, with a chapel in Wiedenest/Pernze

Evangelical parishes
 Evangelisch-freikirchliche Gemeinden (Brüdergemeinden) Wiedenest
 Evangelisch-freikirchliche Gemeinden (Brüdergemeinden) Hackenberg
 Evangelisch-freikirchliche Gemeinde (Baptisten) Bergneustadt, Wilhelmstrasse
 Common Bible school - Wiedenest (this is the bible school of the German brethren)
 Christen ohne Namen (= Christians without a name)
 Ecclesia

Other religious groups
 Jehovah's Witnesses
 New Apostolic Church

Associations
 FC Wiedenest-Othetal (football) www.fc-wiedenest-othetal.de
 TV Bergneustadt (different sports, e.g. handball, gymnastics, karate)
 Chess association Bergneustadt/Derschlag
 Stamp collector's association Bergneustadt
 Baris Spor Hackenberg (football)
 SSV Bergneustadt (football)
 Bodyguard (kickboxing, Thai-boxing, boxing, yoga)
 Table tennis association "Schwalbe" Bergneustadt  ("Schwalbe" being the main sponsor)
 Soar club Bergneustadt
 German Red Cross Bergneustadt
 HSG Bergneustadt-Gummersbach
 BSV (swimming)
 THW-Bergneustadt
 The Voices (choir with newer repertoire)

Economy
The city's major employer is Metalsa Automotive GmbH (formerly Innomotive Systems Europe GmbH or briefly called ISE) - a supplier of the automotive industry which is specialized in the development and production of innovative structural and safety systems for automobiles. With 2000 employees in Germany and 12200 globally.

Population

Transport

Road
Bergneustadt is connected to the Bundesautobahn 4 (Cologne - Olpe) by a feeder road. The Bundesstraße 55 runs through the city centre, through the district Wiedenest and along the district Pernze. It connects the town with Gummersbach (in the West) and Drolshagen (in the East).

Public transport
At the bus stop Graf-Eberhard-Platz in the city centre are stopping the following bus lines:
 No. 301 : Gummersbach —- Bergneustadt —- Olpe
 No. 313 : Bergneustadt (city centre) —- Attenbach
 No. 314 : Bergneustadt (city centre) —- Hackenberg (district)
 No. 315 : Bergneustadt (city centre) —- Stadtwald (district)

Air transport
There is an airfield with a 600 m (1968.5 ft) long grass airstrip in the district Auf dem Dümpel.
Planes with one motor and a maximal weight of 3,400 pounds and helicopters with a maximal weight of 11,400 pounds are allowed to alight.

Town twinnings
  Châtenay-Malabry, F, 1967
  Landsmeer, NL, since 1968
Châtenay-Malabry and Landsmeer are also twinned since 1986
 „Arbeitsgemeinschaft Neustadt in Europa“ (see the german Wikipedia: „Neustadt in Europa“)

Notable people
 Friedhelm Julius Beucher (born 1946), teacher, politician (SPD), member of the Bundestag 1990–2002
 Anja Harteros (born 1972), opera singer
 Horst Janzen (1930–1978), painter
 Johann Gottlieb Nörremberg (1787–1862), physicist
 Heinz Schilling (born 1942), historian at the Humboldt University of Berlin

References
 Günther Aders, Quellen zur Geschichte der Stadt Bergneustadt und des alten Amtes Neustadt von 1109 bis 1630 = Sources for the History of the City of Bergneustadt and the old Amtes Neustadt from 1109 to 1630, pg. 71, 1951, 7-268
 Marianne Hack and Hubertus Dan - Literaturverzeichnis zur Geschichte Bergneustadts im 19. und 20. Jahrhundert = Bibliography to the History of Bergneustadts in the 19th and the 20th centuries, Gummersbach, 1991
 Bergneustadt 1301-1951, Festschrift, Bergneustadt 1951

Sources

External links

 Official website 
 General information about Bergneustadt 

Towns in North Rhine-Westphalia
Oberbergischer Kreis